The Exodus is the fourth album released by Gospel Gangstaz.  It was released on October 15, 2002, for Native Record and featured production from Mr. Solo, Tik Tokk, Chillie' Baby, Prodeje, Bootsy Collins and Bobby Ross Avila.  The Exodus found some success, making it to 17 on the Top Gospel Albums and 85 on the Top R&B/Hip-Hop Albums Billboard charts.  The Exodus was the first album by the Gospel Gangstaz to not make it to the Top Christian Albums and the first to make it on the Top R&B/Hip-Hop album chart.

Track listing
"Exodus Intro"- 1:17  
"Gangstaz Don't Dance"- 3:53 (Featuring Bootsy Collins)  
"Watch, Pray, Live Holy"- 4:27  
"A-O"- 4:12  
"Interlude"- 1:04  
"Caught Up"- 4:15  
"Gangsta'd Up"- 4:14  
"Trouble Don't Last"- 4:36  
"Heaven Awaits Us"- 4:16  
"Scream"- 4:26  
"Bounce With Us"- 3:28  
"Interlude"- 0:35  
"My Lesson"- 3:49  
"Bad Company" (Featuring Kam)- 3:53  
"Change"- 4:48

2002 albums
Gospel Gangstaz albums
G-funk albums